Nürnberg Falcons BC, formerly called Nürnberger BC (abbreviated as NBC) is a basketball club based in Nuremberg, Germany. The team currently in the ProA, the German professional second division. In 2010–11 the team promoted from the ProB to the ProA.

In 2019, Nürnberg finished as runner-up in the ProA. The Falcons play their home games since 2021 in the new build Kia Metropol arena, which has a capacity of 4000 people.

History
In the 2018–19 ProA season, Nürnberg ended in third place in the standings. In the playoffs it defeated second-seeded Heidelberg to qualify for the ProA finals. Because of this achievement, the team earned promotion to the Basketball Bundesliga (BBL) for the first time. In May 2019, it was announced that Falcons did not obtain a license for the BBL due to not meeting requirements on minimum arena size and minimum budget.

Honours
ProA
Runners-up (1): 2018–19

Players

Current squad

Individual awards
ProA MVP
Braydon Hobbs: 2015

Notable players
- Set a club record or won an individual award as a professional player.
- Played at least one official international match for his senior national team at any time.
 Tim Ohlbrecht
 Ish Wainright
 Braydon Hobbs
 Dupree McBrayer
 Dan Oppland
 Eric Washington
 Diante Watkins

References

External links
 Nürnberger BC  
 Eurobasket.com Team Page

Basketball teams established in 2002
Basketball teams in Germany
Sport in Nuremberg